Erkka Westerlund (born 30 March 1957, in Pernå, Finland) was the head coach of the Finnish national men's ice hockey team. He was appointed head coach on November 1, 2004, and his contract ended in May 2007, after winning World Championship Silver in Moscow's World Championship tournament. He followed Raimo Summanen as head coach of the national team.

Career
Westerlund has coached several Finnish ice hockey teams in the SM-Liiga: JYP (1985–1988), Lukko (1989–1991), HIFK (1997–1999) and Jokerit (1999–2001). During his coaching career Westerlund has won the Finnish Championship once: 1998, with HIFK and finished twice in the second place, in 1999 and 2000. Internationally Westerlund coached Finland in four tournaments, receiving medals in three of them. He has won one Olympic Silver medal (2006) in Turin, one World Championship Silver (2007) and one World Championship Bronze (2006).

As a player Westerlund was a forward. He played in the 1978/1979 season for Jukurit, in 34 games he scored 7 goals and gave 10 assists. In the 1980/1981 season he played for JYP. Here he played 23 games, scoring 3 goals and 1 assist.

References

External links

JYP Jyväskylä players
Mikkelin Jukurit players
Living people
Finnish ice hockey players
1957 births
Finland men's national ice hockey team coaches
Ice hockey coaches at the 2014 Winter Olympics
People from Pernå
Sportspeople from Uusimaa
Olympic bronze medalists for Finland
Olympic medalists in ice hockey
Medalists at the 2014 Winter Olympics